Rajeshwor Devkota (8 October 1929 – 10 August 2015) was a Nepalese politician and writer. He was elected into the National Panchayat for several terms and has also served as the speaker, and as minister for education and land reforms. He received the Madan Puraskar and the Sajha Purasakar literary awards.

References

External links

2015 deaths
1929 births
Nepalese male writers
Nepali-language writers
Place of birth missing
Members of the Rastriya Panchayat
Members of the National Assembly (Nepal)
Sajha Puraskar winners
Khas people